Odintsovo is a railway station of Line D1 of the Moscow Central Diameters in Odintsovo, Moscow Oblast. It was opened in 1870 and will be rebuilt by 2024.

Gallery

References

Railway stations in Moscow Oblast
Railway stations of Moscow Railway
Railway stations in the Russian Empire opened in 1870
Line D1 (Moscow Central Diameters) stations